Rothenburg/Oberlausitz (Upper Sorbian Rózbork) is a small Lusatian town in eastern Saxony, Germany on the Neisse river on the German-Polish border. It has a population of 4,405 (2020).

The town was first mentioned in 1268. In 1815, the town, became part of the Kingdom of Prussia. From 1816 until 1945 it was the seat of the district of Rothenburg (Ob. Laus.) in Prussian Silesia.

Localities of Rothenburg are Bremenhain (first mentioned in 1396), Geheege, Lodenau, Neusorge (first mentioned in 1564), Nieder-Neundorf, Steinbach and Uhsmannsdorf (first mentioned in 1388 as "Osansdorf").

Some of its attractions are the Town Park, Marketplace and the Evangelische Stadtkirche (Town Evangelical Church) which was built in 1798, the tower of which was badly damaged in April 1945, during an air-raid bombing.  The church was restored later and stands at a focal-point of the town square and marketplace.

Points of interest include the former site of the Castle Rothenburg (b.1686-WWII) which once laid on the edge of the main town square, the dam on the Neisse river once used as a bathing area for locals, and Martinshof, a still operational home and complex for the mentally and physically disabled, the innovative brainchild of Friedrich von Martin in 1883. Most of the first houses and barns of the establishment still remain, bearing the original biblical names given to them by Martin himself, such as "Bethlehem".

Despite several landmarks in the town having been hit hard by shells from the air raids during the Second World War, the town has preserved much of its original medieval charm and old world feel. Nearby places of interest include Niesky to the southwest and Görlitz directly south of town, which is a true Medieval town complete with city walls, great hotels and festivals.

Population development

1815: 1028
1844: 1013
1885: 1310
1925: 1617
1970: 3500
1990: 5500
2015: 4760

Personalities
 Wigand of Gersdorff (1851-1920), Prussian general lieutenant
 Paul Rentsch (1898-1944), dentist and resistance fighter; Righteous among the Nations
 Iris Wittig (1928-1978), first military pilot of the GDR
 Reinhard Leue (1929-2012), Protestant theologian, publicist, author and chronicler
∗ Rabbi Meir of Rothenburg (1215 - 1293)

References 

Towns in Görlitz (district)